A Pfostenschlitzmauer (German for "post-slot wall") is the name for defensive walls protecting Bronze Age and Iron Age hill forts and oppida in Central Europe, especially in Bavaria and the Czech Republic. They are characterized by vertical wooden posts set into the front stone facing. The rampart is constructed from a timber lattice filled with earth or rubble. The transverse cross-beams may also protrude through the stone facing, as with the murus gallicus used in Gaul and western Germany. It is sometimes referred to in English as a timber-framed wall.

The construction method is also known as "Kelheim-style", named after the extensive ramparts at the oppidum of Kelheim.

At the oppidum of Manching, an earlier murus gallicus rampart was rebuilt in Pfostenschlitzmauer style.

Gallery

See also 
 Murus Dacicus
 Murus Gallicus
 Urnfield culture
 Hallstatt culture

References 

 The Ancient Celts, Barry Cunliffe (1997) 
 Celtic Fortifications, Ian Ralston (2006) 
 Manching: Die Keltenstadt, Susanne Sievers (2003), 

Fortification (architectural elements)
Hill forts
Oppida
Iron Age Europe
German words and phrases